Prudente de Morais Neto or Prudente de Moraes Neto (1904–1977), writing under the pseudonym Pedro Dantas was a Brazilian lawyer and journalist.

He was editor of the Diário Carioca. He was severely critical of left-leaning president João Goulart who was deposed by the 1964 Brazilian military coup, though after the coup protected leftist journalists among his friends.

References

Brazilian journalists
1904 births
1977 deaths
20th-century journalists